Alépé Department is a department of La Mé Region in Lagunes District, Ivory Coast. In 2021, its population was 180,253 and its seat is the settlement of Alépé. The sub-prefectures of the department are Aboisso-Comoé, Alépé, Allosso, Danguira, and Oghlwapo.

History
Alépé Department was created in 1998 as a second-level subdivision via a split-off from Abidjan Department. At its creation, it was part of Lagunes Region.

In 2011, districts were introduced as new first-level subdivisions of Ivory Coast. At the same time, regions were reorganised and became second-level subdivisions and all departments were converted into third-level subdivisions. At this time, Alépé Department became part of La Mé Region in Lagunes District.

Notes

Departments of La Mé
1998 establishments in Ivory Coast
States and territories established in 1998